Colmers School is a coeducational secondary school and sixth form located in the Rednal area of Birmingham, in the West Midlands of England.

Previously a community school solely administered by Birmingham City Council, Colmers School became a foundation school in 2009. The school offers GCSEs and BTECs as programmes of study for pupils. The school also has a sixth form consisting of Year 12 and 13 students, based in its Sixth Form Centre with students studying a range of A-level subjects.

The school has a house system, currently comprising three houses: Wolf, Eagle and Dolphin. Students join one of the three houses upon entry to the school and compete in range of areas to win the annually-awarded House Cup.

Colmers Community Leisure Centre also operates from the school site, offering sports and leisure facilities to the local community outside school hours.

References

External links
Colmers School official website

Secondary schools in Birmingham, West Midlands
Foundation schools in Birmingham, West Midlands